Josef Anton Bellesini was a mayor of Vienna.

References 

Mayors of Vienna